Acrobasis praefectella is a species of snout moth in the genus Acrobasis. It was described by Zerny in 1936. It is found in Morocco.

References

Moths described in 1936
Acrobasis
Endemic fauna of Morocco
Moths of Africa